Mike Seate (born in 1965) is a motorcycle journalist, TV producer and presenter from Pittsburgh, Pennsylvania. In addition to newspaper columns, Seate has authored books and is the founder of Café Racer magazine.

Works

Books

Documentaries
Glory Road: The Legacy of the African-American Motorcyclist (2005)
American Biker (2005)
Quite Frankly, with Stephen A. Smith (2005)
Café Society, Café Racer Documentary (2010)

TV Series
Café Racer (2008 to date) Velocity (Discovery HD Theater)

References

External links
 Café Racer magazine
 

21st-century American male writers
Motorcycle journalists
Living people
1965 births
Journalists from Pennsylvania